The British Army Mountaineering Association (AMA) is the governing body for climbing competitions and the representative body for mountaineering in the British Army. It is a member of the British Mountaineering Council and is the largest climbing club in the United Kingdom.

History, Organisation and Status 
The AMA was formed on 24 May 1957. It has charitable status and its constitution states that it exists 'To promote military efficiency by encouraging mountaineering in the Army'. Membership is open to serving members of the British Army and the Army Reserve. Since its inception the AMA has been involved in delivering and supporting mountaineering activity for its members. The association is currently engaged in two major areas of activity which are: mountaineering and climbing competitions each of which is governed separately.

The business of the AMA is managed by an executive committee who are elected annually.  Its current president is Major General David Southall

Mountaineering 

The AMA organises mountaineering training and expeditions for its members and encourages them to organise their own expeditions. It makes grants from the AMA 'Memorial Fund' to help support individuals wishing to take part in significant mountaineering expeditions.
 Since its inception the AMA has organised or provided significant support to a number of major expedition to the Greater Ranges including:
 1959 – Malubiting East (First Ascent)
 1960 – Annapurna II (First Ascent) (Joint Service)
 1962 – Khunyang Chhish (also known as Khinyang Chhish)
 1967 - West Greenland - Kangerlussuatsiaq Fjord
 1968 - East Greenland - Kristians Glacier
 1969 – Tirich Mir
 1969 - North Greenland - Peary Land (Joint Service)(Army led)
 1970 – Annapurna
 1971 - AMA West Greenland (Evighedsfjord).
 1972 – Axel Heiberg Island
 1972 - Patagonia - Northern Patagonian Ice Field (Chile) - (Joint Services)(Army led)
 1973 - Himachal Pradesh Expedition
 1974 – Lamjung Himal
 1975 – Nuptse (Joint British Army/Royal Nepalese Army expedition)
 1976 – Mount Everest – South Col (Joint British Army/Royal Nepalese Army expedition)
 1978 - East Greenland - Scoresby Sound area.
 1980 – Api
 1982 - Ngadi Chuli (Peak 29) 
 1985 – Kirat Chuli (Joint British Army/Royal Nepalese Army expedition)
 1986 - Alpamayo
 1987 – Shishapangma (Xixabangma) (Joint AMA / Civilian expedition)
 1987 – Saser Kangri (First Ascent of Saser Kangri IV)
 1988 – Mount Everest – West Ridge
 1989 - East Greenland - Liverpool Land
 1990 – Gyachung Kang
 1992 – Annapurna IV
 1992 – Mount Everest – West Ridge
 1994 – Mount Foraker – Archangel Ridge (Second Ascent)
 1996 – Gasherbrum I (Hidden Peak)
 2000 – Kangchenjunga (Joint Service) – (Royal Navy lead)
 2004 – Makalu (Joint Service – RAF Lead)
 2006 – Mount Everest – West Ridge
 2007 – Shishapangma
 2008 – Makalu (Joint Service – RAF Lead)
 2012 – Antarctica – Graham Land (Joint Service – British Army Lead)
 2015 – Mount Everest – North Ridge (Received AMA Support)
 2017 – Putha Hiunchuli – Normal Route

Climbing Competitions 
The AMA organises bouldering and indoor sport climbing competitions for the Army.  The first Army level sport climbing competition was organised at Bristol by Colonel Paul John Edwards on 28 April 1995.  The AMA continues to organise indoor climbing competitions and now competes annually against the Royal Navy and RAF, as well as contributing members to the Combined Services Sport Climbing team, which competes regularly against military sport climbers from other countries.

Prominent AMA members 
The following are current/former presidents, vice-presidents or Chairman of the AMA.
 Field Marshal Sir Gerald Templer KG, GCB, GCMG, KBE, DSO (President) (Loyal Regiment (North Lancashire))
 Brigadier John Hunt, Baron Hunt KG, CBE, DSO, PC (vice-president) (King's Royal Rifle Corps)
 Sir Chris Bonington CVO, CBE, DL (Honorary Vice-president) (Royal Tank Regiment)
 Lieutenant Colonel Tony Streather OBE (Honorary President) (Gloucestershire Regiment)

UIAGM Mountain Guides: The following AMA members have become members of the British Association of Mountain Guides
 Major Mac McKay (Royal Army Physical Training Corps)
 Captain Stuart McDonald (Royal Engineers) (Everest Summiteer).
 Warrant Officer Class 1 Paul Chiddle (Royal Army Physical Training Corps)
 Captain Tania Noakes (Royal Signals)

Other notable AMA Members:
 Lieutenant Colonel Charles Wylie OBE (Ghurkas) – Organising Secretary to the 1953 British Mount Everest expedition.
 Lieutenant Colonel J. O. M. Roberts MVO, MC (Ghurkas) – First Ascents of Annapurna II – 1960, Mera Peak – 20 May 1953 and Putha Hiunchuli – 11 November 1952.
 Colonel Henry Day (Royal Engineers) – Member of the Tirich Mir expedition (1969), made the 2nd ascent (and first British ascent) of Annapurna 1970,. He was a member of the 1973 Himachal Pradesh expedition, and the Everest expedition (1976). He led an RE expedition to Trisul II (1978) and to the Da Xue Shan mountains (1981). He led the climbers attempting to climb the east face of Xixabangma (1987) and in 2008 organised a climbing expedition to the Georgian Causasus.
 Colonel Meryon Bridges, OBE, Royal Engineers was a member of the 1971 AMA Greenland (Evighedsfjord) and the 1972 AMA Alex Heiberg expeditions and then took part in eight Himalayan expeditions between 1973 and 1996, including Everest (1976), Api (1980), Everest (1992), and then led the successful Gasherbrum I (1996) expedition.
 Lieutenant Colonel Jon W A Fleming OBE Parachute Regiment (United Kingdom) – Deputy leader of Greenland expeditions 1967 & 1968, Leader of Tirich Mir Expedition 1969, Leader of Himachal Pradesh Expedition 1973 & Leader of Nuptse Expedition 1975, Organising Secretary Everest Expedition 1976, Co-author Soldiers on Everest.
 Lieutenant Colonel A J Muston, RAOC, MBE, FRGS. Vice President AMA, President, The Arctic Club (1995). Leader or member of 6 Army expeditions to Greenland in 1971, 1979, 1980, 1984, 1988, and 1989; leader Axel Heiberg, Canada expedition in 1972; and to the Himalayas in 1973 (Himachal Pradesh), 1975 (Nuptse), 1976 (Everest) and 1982 (West Nepal) with many other expeditions after leaving service in 1989 including an expedition to East Greenland in 2011.
 Major Sir Crispin Agnew of Lochnaw Bt, RHF, FRGS (1969) – Member RN Expedition to Greenland 1966, Leader Army East Greenland 1968, Member Joint Services Elephant Island Expedition 1970/71, Leader Joint Services Chilean Patagonia Expedition 1972/73, Member Nuptse Expedition 1975, Member Everest Expedition 1976, Leader Army Api Expedition 1980.
 Major Timothy King, RAOC. AMA Executive Committee member 1980 to 1989,  Chair 1989 to 1992 and Chair Joint Services Mountaineering Committee. Started “The Army Mountaineer”, the Journal of the AMA. Leader of AMA Expeditions to Liverpool Land (1989); Sondestrom Fiord (1992); member of the Axel Heiberg Island (1972), Nuptse (1975), Everest (1976), and NE Greenland (1980) expeditions.
 Major Bronco Lane MM, BEM (Special Air Service) – Ascent of Everest, 16 May 1976
 John Stokes (mountaineer) (Brummy Stokes), BEM (Special Air Service) – Ascent of Everest, 16 May 1976 with Bronco Lane
 Major Mike Smith (Royal Electrical and Mechanical Engineers) – UK veteran sport climbing champion 2009

References

External links 
 Army Mountaineering Association – Official site

Mountaineering in the United Kingdom
Mount
Organizations established in 1957